The Ch'ŏngnyŏn P'arwŏn Line is a non-electrified standard-gauge secondary railway line of the Korean State Railway in North P'yŏngan Province, North Korea, running from Kujang on the Manp'o and P'yŏngdŏk Lines to Kusŏng on the P'yŏngbuk Line.

This line serves the Nyŏngbyŏn Nuclear Scientific Research Centre via the Pun'gang Line, which joins the mainline at P'arwŏn.

History
A line from Tŏkch'ŏn to P'arwŏn had been planned already in the 1940s by the West Chosen Central Railway, after receiving permission from the Railway Bureau of the Government-General of Korea in 1940 to extend its line beyond Tŏkch'ŏn. However, by the end of the war, construction had been completed only as far as Changsangri (today on the Changsang Line), although work had begun on the line towards Kujang; it was only in 1953 after the end of the Korean War that the Tŏkp'al Line to P'arwŏn (the line's name came from the two termini, Tŏkch'ŏn and P'alwŏn) via Kujang was finally completed. The line was then extended further, reaching Kusŏng in 1976. Although by then the line ran Kujang–Kusŏng and the Tŏkch'ŏn–Kujang section had been made part of the P'yŏngdŏk Line, it retained the "Tŏkp'al Line" name until then.

Services 

Local passenger trains 795/796 operate on this line between Kujang Ch'ŏngnyŏn and Kusŏng.

Route 

A yellow background in the "Distance" box indicates that section of the line is not electrified.

References

Railway lines in North Korea
Standard gauge railways in North Korea